Heinz-Günter Schenk (born 16 January 1942) is a German athlete. He competed in the men's triple jump at the 1968 Summer Olympics and the 1972 Summer Olympics.

References

1942 births
Living people
Athletes (track and field) at the 1968 Summer Olympics
Athletes (track and field) at the 1972 Summer Olympics
German male triple jumpers
Olympic athletes of East Germany
Place of birth missing (living people)